Luukkonen is a Finnish surname. Notable people with the surname include:

 Gabriel Luukkonen (1880–1943), Finnish politician
 Fanni Luukkonen (1882–1947), leader of the Finnish Lotta Svärd
 Risto-Veikko Luukkonen (1902–1972), Finnish architect
 Risto Luukkonen (1931–1967), Finnish boxer
 Aino-Maija Luukkonen (born 1958), Finnish politician
 Ukko-Pekka Luukkonen (born 1999), Finnish professional ice hockey goaltender

Finnish-language surnames